Louis Noverraz (10 May 1902 – 15 May 1972) was a Swiss competitive sailor and Olympic medalist. He won a silver medal in the 5.5 Metre class at the 1968 Summer Olympics in Mexico City, together with Bernard Dunand and Marcel Stern.

He sailed on France at the 1970 America's Cup.

References

1902 births
1972 deaths
Swiss male sailors (sport)
Olympic sailors of Switzerland
Olympic silver medalists for Switzerland
Olympic medalists in sailing
Medalists at the 1968 Summer Olympics
Sailors at the 1936 Summer Olympics – 6 Metre
Sailors at the 1948 Summer Olympics – 6 Metre
Sailors at the 1952 Summer Olympics – 6 Metre
Sailors at the 1968 Summer Olympics – 5.5 Metre
1970 America's Cup sailors
6 Metre class sailors
5.5 Metre class sailors
World Champions in 5.5 Metre
World champions in sailing for Switzerland
Sportspeople from the canton of Vaud
20th-century Swiss people